Khabur is the name of two river tributaries:
 Khabur (Euphrates)
 Khabur (Tigris)